Riverside Theatres is a multi-venue performing arts centre located in the CBD of Parramatta in the western suburbs of Sydney, New South Wales, Australia.

Opened in 1988, its venues include the 761-seat proscenium arch Riverside Theatre, the 213-seat Lennox Theatre, and the 88-seat Raffety's Theatre. The proscenium arch's architectural design is inspired from the common European Opera House concept which lends an intimate and live performance space. It is considered to be an A Reserve house, which implies that the sight-lines are perfect for most seats and a standard ticket price is applicable to the entire house at the Hirer's discretion.

The National Theatre of Parramatta is a resident theatre company. Other regular companies and productions that perform there include Packemin Productions, Sydney Theatre Company, Sport For Jove, The Premier State Ballet, Cumberland Gang Show and Pacific Opera.

References

Theatres in Sydney
Buildings and structures in Parramatta
Theatres completed in 1988